Marie Françoise Catherine de Beauvau-Craon, marquise de Boufflers (1711–1786), commonly known as Madame de Boufflers, was a French noblewoman. She was the royal mistress of Stanislas Leszczyński and mother of the poet Stanislas de Boufflers.

Family

Her father was Marc de Beauvau, Prince of Beauvau-Craon, and her mother was Anne Marguerite de Lignéville (1686–1772), mistress of Leopold, Duke of Lorraine. She had nineteen siblings, including Charles Juste de Beauvau, through whom she was a sister-in-law of Marie Charlotte de La Tour d'Auvergne. Marie Françoise Catherine married Louis François de Boufflers (1714–1752), marquis d'Amestranges, with whom she had Stanislas de Boufflers, later famous as a poet.

Life

Witty, well-educated and beautiful, the marquise de Boufflers wrote verse and drew in pastel. At the court at Lunéville, aged 34, she became the chief mistress to king Stanislas, then aged 64. This did not stop her also collecting other lovers; nicknamed La Dame de Volupté ("the lady of delight"), she was also the mistress of the poet Jean François de Saint-Lambert, then of M. of Adhémar, of the intendant de Lorraine Antoine-Martin Chaumont de La Galaizière, of the lawyer and poet François-Antoine Devaux.

To try to make the Marquise de Boufflers jealous and regain her affections, Saint-Lambert attempted to seduce the Marquise du Châtelet when the latter arrived in Lunéville in 1748. The Marquise du Châtelet fell passionately in love with the poet and became best friends with the Marquise de Boufflers, thus completely ruining the plans of Father Menou, Stanislas' confessor, who wanted to use her to dislodge the Marquise de Boufflers as chief mistress to the king.

Her witty poem "Sentir avec ardeur" is cited in French and in full by the twentieth-century Modernist poet Marianne Moore in the notes to Moore's poem "Tom Fool at Jamaica."

References 

1711 births
1786 deaths
Marie-Francoise
French marchionesses
Mistresses of Polish royalty
People from Lunéville